Hop Harrigan (also known as The Guardian Angel and Black Lamp) is a fictional character
published by All-American Publications. He appeared in American comic books, radio serials and film serials. He was created by Jon Blummer, and was a popular hero originally through the 1940s, during the events of World War II.

Publication history
The character first appeared in the anthology comic book series All American Comics #1 (April 1939) by the All-American Publications publishing company, as one of the early aviation heroes in comic history. He was a recurring character by the publishing company appearing in many magazines including anthology magazines like All-Flash, All-Star Comics, Green Lantern, Mutt & Jeff, Wonder Woman, Comic Cavalcade, Sensation Comics and Flash Comics.

For a brief period in 1941, Blummer considered turning Hop Harrigan into a superhero, as many other strips were converting to follow the new trend. Harrigan appeared in costume from March to July, and then Blummer dropped the idea.

Fictional summary 
Hop Harrigan had been orphaned by his father, a legendary pilot, who disappeared on a flight to South America to see his wife. Hop's story begins with him being raised by his neighbor, the cruel farmer Silas Crane, who gets legal guardianship of him in order to obtain Hop's inheritance. 

When Hop Harrigan is a teenager, Crane tries to destroy a biplane that had once been in the possession of Hop's father. Seeing this, Hop angrily knocks the old man to the ground and escapes in the biplane, not planning to return. He arrives at an airport where he saves the life of mechanic Tank Tinker, who became his friend and companion. Tank gives Harrigan his nickname when he said, "Some hop, Harrigan". 

Later, Hop, Tank and Prop Wash (the pilot who accidentally endangers Tank), along with help from an heiress (who later becomes Hop's girlfriend), set up the All-American Aviation Company, and they have a variety of exciting adventures. Hop briefly takes on the costumed identity of the Guardian Angel.

By the time World War II comes, as with most other comics of the time, the Hop Harrigan comic has World War II themed adventures as Hop, Tank and Prop join the US Army Air Corps in service of the war effort.

Shortly after the war, the character appears for a while under the alias the Black Lamp.

Media adaptations
On radio, Hop Harrigan was broadcast on ABC from August 31, 1942, until August 2, 1946, and on Mutual from October 2, 1946, until February 6, 1948. Charles Stratton appeared in the title role with Ken Lynch as Tank. Lynch was later replaced by Jackson Beck, voice actor for Bluto (Popeye), King Leonardo and Perry White (Superman). Mitzi Gould played Hop's girlfriend, Gail Nolan. One of the writers for this series was noir novelist David Goodis.

The Hop Harrigan 15-chapter movie serial (March 28, 1946) was produced by Columbia Pictures with William Bakewell as Hop and Sumner Getchell as Tank. This was Hop's first and only screen appearance.

Hop Harrigan is mentioned as a childhood bully of Sylvester Pemberton in Season 2 Episode 10 of Stargirl. Pemberton, appearing in a flashback, recounts how Harrigan beat him up and stole a watch that he believed was given to him by his parents but was instead secretly left for him by Pat Dugan.

See also
DC Comics

References

External links
Hop Harrigan at Don Markstein's Toonopedia. Archived from the original on February 5, 2016.
Hop Harrigan at the Grand Comics Database.

Comics characters introduced in 1939
All-American Publications characters
Golden Age superheroes
1940s American radio programs
Mutual Broadcasting System programs
DC Comics military personnel
DC Comics superheroes
Fictional aviators
Fictional World War II veterans
Aviation comics
American comics adapted into films
ABC radio programs
Fictional fighter pilots